Embūte is a village in Embūte Parish, South Kurzeme Municipality in the Courland region of Latvia.

See also
 Embūte Castle

References

Villages in Latvia
Latvian airbases
Soviet Air Force bases
Soviet Air Defence Force bases
South Kurzeme Municipality
Aizpute County
Courland